Mykola Panasovych Vorobyov (born 12 October 1941 in Melnykivka) is a Ukrainian  poet.  He is a founding member of the Kyiv School of Poetry He won a  2005 Shevchenko National Prize in Literature.

In 1968, he was expelled from Taras Shevchenko National University of Kyiv.

Works 

 «Букініст» (1966)
 «Без кори» (1967)
 «Пригадай на дорогу мені» (1985)
 «Місяць шипшини» (1986)
 «Ожина обрію» (1988)
 «Прогулянка одинцем» (1990)
 «Верховний голос» (1991)
 «Іскри в слідах» (1993)
 «Човен» (1999)
 «Срібна рука» (2000)
 «Слуга півонії» (2003)
 «Оманливий оркестр» (2006)
 «Без кори. Вибране» (2007)
 «Скринька з прикрасами» (2014)
 «Гора і квітка» (2018)
 «Намальовані двері» (2019)

Works in English 
 Wild Dog Rose Moon, 1992 Exile Editions, 
 Mountain and Flower: The Selected Poems of Mykola Vorobiov, Maria G. Rewakowicz translator, Lost Horse Press, 2020

References

External links 
A Quiet Revolution (Ukrainian Poets 1970s) HARVARD UKRAINIAN STUDIES

Shevchenko National Prize
Ukrainian poets
Living people
1941 births